The Ratnagiri Hindu Sabha was established with the object of "organising and consolidating the Hindus into an organic whole with a view to enabling them to resist effectively any unjust aggression, and protecting their cultural, economic and religious rights".

The Sabha reconverted many persons to the Hindu faith; its mixed caste schools reduced the number of converts from the American Mission School. The programme of reconversion was opposed by Christians, Muslim missionaries, and the orthodox Hindus. Describing its formation, Keer writes that it was "established ostensibly through the influence and attempts of Babarao Savarkar, but, in fact, inspired by Vinayak Damodar Savarkar himself". Keer dates the establishment at two weeks after the internment of Savarkar in Ratnagiri on January 6, 1924.

References

Hindutva
Religious organisations based in India
Hindu new religious movements
Defunct Hindu organizations